Nigeria is an album by American jazz guitarist Grant Green featuring performances recorded for the Blue Note label on January 13, 1962 but not released until 1980. Pianist Sonny  Clark and bassist Sam Jones return from Green’s previous session, Gooden's Corner, and are joined by legendary drummer, Art Blakey. The tracks were also released in 1997 as part of The Complete Quartets with Sonny Clark.

Reception

The Allmusic review by Michael Erlewine awarded the album 4½ stars and stated "Just classic Green".

Track listing
 "Airegin" (Sonny Rollins) - 7:32
 "It Ain't Necessarily So" (George Gershwin, Ira Gershwin) - 10:22
 "I Concentrate on You" (Cole Porter) - 5:48
 "The Things We Did Last Summer" (Sammy Cahn, Jule Styne) - 5:56
 "The Song Is You" (Oscar Hammerstein II, Jerome Kern) - 7:46

Personnel
Grant Green - guitar
Sonny Clark - piano
Sam Jones - bass
Art Blakey - drums

References 

Grant Green albums
1962 albums
Blue Note Records albums
Albums produced by Alfred Lion
Albums recorded at Van Gelder Studio